Figure skating at the 2022 European Youth Olympic Winter Festival was held from 20 to 25 March 2022 at the Vuokatti Arena in Vuokatti, Finland. Medals were awarded in boys' and girls' singles. To be eligible, skaters must have been born between 1 July 2004 and 30 June 2006.

On 1 March 2022, the International Skating Union banned figure skaters and officials from Russia and Belarus from attending all international competitions due to the 2022 Russian invasion of Ukraine. On 2 March 2022, in accordance with a recommendation by the International Olympic Committee, the European Olympic Committees suspended the participation of Russia and Belarus from the 2022 European Youth Olympic Winter Festival.

Schedule

Medal summary

Medalists

Medals by country

Entries 
Eligible ISU member nations were required to confirm the number of their entries by fall 2021. Member nations and their respective Olympic committees began announcing entries in February 2022. The International Skating Union published a complete list of entries on 15 March 2022.

Changes to preliminary entries

Results

Boys

Girls

References

External links 
 EYOF 2022 at the International Skating Union
 
 Results

2022
European Youth Olympic Winter Festival
2022 European Youth Olympic Winter Festival events
International figure skating competitions hosted by Finland